Luis Rojas Mena (June 21, 1917 – March 18, 2009) was a Mexican Bishop of the Roman Catholic Church.

Rojas Mena was born in Jalpa de Cánovas, Guanajuato, and ordained on March 31, 1945. He was appointed Auxiliary Bishop of the Diocese of Culiacán on May 6, 1968, along with Titular Bishop of Accia, and was ordained a bishop on June 16, 1968. Rojas Mena was appointed as Bishop of Diocese of Culiacán on August 20, 1969, and retired as such on October 4, 1993

See also
Diocese of Culiacán

External links
Catholic-Hierarchy

1917 births
2009 deaths
20th-century Roman Catholic bishops in Mexico